7NN is a Spanish free-to-air television channel run by the Producciones Audiovisuales Hispania, was launched on 12 October 2021. The channel broadcasts for free in Madrid and through pay television in the rest of Spain, in addition to maintaining free transmission over the digital platforms. It is considered a channel with a conservative tendency and close to the postulates of Vox, a far-right political party.

History
In September 2021, the foundation of a new Spanish information channel began to be mentioned, which would be directed by Marcial Cuquerella and would be aimed at a conservative-leaning audience. At first the project was named La Alternativa, its founders sought to establish a channel similar in style to Fox News and extend channel's area of influence to Spain, Latin America and the United States.

The channel began broadcasting on October 12, 2021, National Holiday of Spain, although with the name 7NN and under tests, although maintaining normal programming, in January 2022 it abandoned the testing phase. In its beginnings, the channel was available in Madrid, Zaragoza and the Region of Murcia through local broadcast frequencies.

At the beginning of 2023, the channel entered into a financial crisis due to poor economic income, for which it underwent a process of staff reduction and the closure of open television frequencies, except in Madrid, for which it continued to broadcast in the capital and through pay television and digital platforms in the rest of Spain.

Programming
7NN's programming is mainly based on the broadcast of news and talk shows, as well as some cultural and entertainment content. The channel's objective at the beginning was to provide informative programming with a conservative ideology to compete with LaSexta or Canal 24 Horas, considered progressive media by part of the Spanish political spectrum.

Ideology
Some media outlets consider 7NN to be close to Vox, an extreme right-wing political party, as well as organizations such as El Yunque and the Francisco Franco National Foundation. However, the directors of the channel allege that they seek to maintain a neutral ideology while telling the truth of the facts.

The channel's postulates have already led it to clashes with some political parties such as PSOE, Podemos, Catalan and Basque separatists and other left-wing or green parties that came to request the prohibition of channel journalists in the Congress of Deputies.

References

External links
 

Conservatism in Spain
Television stations in Spain
Television channels and stations established in 2021
Spanish-language television stations